The  is a high-speed maglev train that the Central Japan Railway Company (JR Central) is developing and testing. JR Central plans to use the L0 series on the Chūō Shinkansen railway line between Tokyo and Osaka, which is under construction.

The L0 series uses the Japanese-designed SCMaglev system. Mitsubishi Heavy Industries and Nippon Sharyo, a subsidiary of JR Central, are building fourteen pre-production vehicles.

Specifications
The nose extends  for better aerodynamics and reduced noise in tunnels. Each row is four seats wide, one less than JR Central shinkansen trains. The cars are more box-shaped than earlier models to allow for more interior space. Cars are painted white and blue.

The train does not require a driver, but does have a camera at the front of both end cars in order to allow for remote operation, in case the automated systems fail. The camera is more apparent on the revised end cars, introduced in 2020. It is moved to a higher position, and increased in size.

The superconducting magnets in the bogies are built by Toshiba and Mitsubishi Electric. The cars are built by Nippon Sharyo, with Mitsubishi Heavy Industries also having built some in the past. Mitsubishi Heavy Industries stopped producing cars in 2017 after car manufacturing cost disagreements with JR central and the Mitsubishi SpaceJet's spiralling development costs. The bogies are arranged in a Jacobs bogie configuration.

Planned operations

Chuo Shinkansen 
Construction on the Chuo Shinkansen line on which the train is intended to run began in December 2014. The first section to Nagoya is expected to be completed in 2027. That section will be approximately 85% tunnels with an estimated cost of ¥5.5trillion (US$46.5billion). The relatively high cost is in large part due to the many tunnels.

The complete line to Osaka is estimated to cost ¥9trillion ($74.7billion), and was expected to be completed by 2045, after an eight-year pause in construction to recuperate costs. However, after receiving a ¥3trillion ($28billion) loan from the Japanese government, JR Central moved the project forward. It now expects to be able to open the full line as early as 2037, with construction beginning immediately after completion of the Tokyo–Nagoya section.

Northeast Maglev 

A route from Washington, D.C. to Baltimore, eventually extending all the way to New York City has received political support in the United States. JR Central chairman Yoshiyuki Kasai spoke with U.S. President Barack Obama about the L0 series during Prime Minister Shinzo Abe's 28 April 2015 visit.

In August 2017, development partner Mitsubishi announced that talks had "stalled" because of "a lack of clarity on the Trump administration's stance on high-speed rail".

In March 2019, Northeast Maglev project director David Henley stated in an interview that they expect to have a Record of Decision for the D.C.–Baltimore section by August 2020, and to begin construction later that same year, or in early 2021. According to Henley, this would allow operations to begin in 2027–28, allowing for a construction period of 7 years.

History

L0 series 
The first L0 series vehicle was delivered to the Yamanashi Maglev Test Line and unveiled to the press in November 2012. The first five vehicles were linked up and placed on the guideway in June 2013.

The first five-car train began test-running at the  Yamanashi Maglev Test Line in June 2013, following completion of extension and upgrade work at the facility, earlier than the originally scheduled September date. The maximum speed of test runs was gradually increased, reaching  by the end of July 2013.

The five-car train was lengthened to seven cars in September 2013, and test-running as a 12-car formation commenced on 25 June 2014. The train was reverted to a 7-car formation later in 2014, and used for public preview rides starting in November.

A series of endurance and speed tests was carried out on the  test rail in April 2015 to examine the reliability and durability of the L0 after repeated high speed usage. Several speed and distance records were set in the process.

After April 2015, the train returned to being used for public preview rides.

Improved L0 Series 

The L0 series are planned to be replaced with a revised model starting May 2020 (named the "Improved L0 series"). This will be the first L0 series to receive power from the guideway through induction. Currently, on-board power is provided by a small gas generator in each end car. The new end cars also feature a relocated and enlarged camera, and are more aerodynamic thanks to the removal of the exhaust vent necessary for the generator. Only one end car will be replaced by 2020, as well as one intermediate car. This means that the train will consist of a combination of revised and original cars for a period of time, and will be able to generate electricity with its onboard generator while testing the new induction system.

The new cars were completed in March 2020. While presenting the new end car to the press, lead designer Motoaki Terai stated that this model represents the completion of around 80–90% of the design goals for the final train.

Variants 
L0 Series: 1 × 12-car set owned by JR Central, introduced in 2011 and planned to be converted to the Improved L0 series starting in June 2020.

Improved L0 Series:  1 × 12-car set planned to be gradually upgraded from L0 series starting June 2020. Two replacement cars have been completed as of April 2020.

Records

Speed records
 16 April 2015: Fastest manned train in the world
 21 April 2015: Fastest manned train in the world

The speed of 590 km/h was sustained for a period of 19 seconds. The train hit its top speed at 10:48 am, about 4 minutes into the run. With 49 JR Central employees on board, the train sustained the speed for 10.8 seconds, travelling  during that time.

Distance records
 10 April 2015: Longest distance travelled in one day, breaking the previous record set in 2003.
 14 April 2015: Longest distance travelled in one day.

See also
 High-speed rail
 Land speed record for rail vehicles
 Shinkansen
 Transrapid
 CRRC Maglev

References

External links

 JR Central press release (Part 1) (26 October 2010) 
 JR Central press release (Part 2) (26 October 2010) 
 SCMAGLEV Website

Central Japan Railway Company
Land speed record rail vehicles
Maglev
Experimental and prototype high-speed trains
Shinkansen train series
Science and technology in Japan
Rail transport articles in need of updating
Nippon Sharyo multiple units
Hitachi multiple units